Alberto Benito Castañeda (born 17 June 1972) is a Spanish retired footballer who played as a central midfielder, and the current director of football of Anorthosis Famagusta FC.

Club career
Born in Madrid, Benito made his senior debuts with Galáctico Pegaso in Tercera División, after graduating with Real Madrid's youth setup. In the 1992 summer he joined Valencia CF, being assigned to the reserves in Segunda División B.

On 23 January 1994 Benito made his first team – and La Liga – debut, coming on as a second-half substitute in a 2–2 home draw against Real Oviedo. In July 1994 he moved to Segunda División side CD Toledo, being a regular starter during his spell at the Castile-La Mancha side.

In January 1999 Benito signed for Cádiz CF in the third level, retiring with the side in 2002, aged only 29.

International career
Benito represented Spain at the 1991 FIFA World Youth Championship in Portugal, playing only one match in an eventual quarterfinal exit.

Post-playing career
Immediately after retiring Benito joined the Andalusians' staff, being a technical secretary at the club. On 26 June 2007 he left the club and joined neighbouring UD Almería, being named director of football.

On 9 June 2014 Benito left the latter, returning to the role roughly a year later.

Personal life
Benito's son Pedro is also a footballer. A forward, he plays and supports San Sebastián de los Reyes.

References

External links

Stats and bio at Cadistas1910 
Stats and bio at CiberChe 

1972 births
Living people
Footballers from Madrid
Spanish footballers
Association football midfielders
La Liga players
Segunda División players
Segunda División B players
Valencia CF Mestalla footballers
Valencia CF players
CD Toledo players
Cádiz CF players
Spain youth international footballers